This is a list of Bien de Interés Cultural landmarks in the Province of Las Palmas on the Canary Islands.

Bienes in multiple municipalities

Bien by municipality

A
Agaete

Agüimes, Las Palmas

Antigua, Fuerteventura

Arrecife (Island of Lanzarote)

 Arucas

B 
 Betancuria

F 
 Firgas

G 

Gáldar, Las Palmas

L 
 La Aldea de San Nicolás

 La Oliva

  Las Palmas de Gran Canaria

M 

 Mogán

 Moya

P 

 Pájara
 

  Puerto del Rosario

S 

 San Bartolomé

 San Bartolomé de Tirajana

 Santa Brigida

 Santa Lucía de Tirajana

 Santa María de Guía de Gran Canaria

T 

  Teguise

  Telde

 Teror

 Tinajo

  Tuineje

V 

 Vega de San Mateo

Y 

  Yaiza

References

Las Palmas